The Zialo are an ethnic group of Guinea. It is also the language traditionally spoken by these people.

People
Population is estimated at 25,000

Language
Zialo is a Southwestern Mande language.  Zialo has five major dialects: Bayawa, Wolo-Ziolo, Woyjawa, Kelighigo and Lawolozu.

Ethnic groups in Guinea